Zepped is a 1916 propaganda comedy short film about a German Zeppelin attack on London during the First World War. Charlie Chaplin appears in the film, although it is unlikely he himself was involved in the production. Making use of stop-motion animation, Zepped may have used previously unknown outtakes of three or four earlier Chaplin films: His New Profession (1914), A Jitney Elopement (1915) and The Tramp (1915), and according to Bonhams, By the Sea (1915).

Two copies are known: one was unknowingly purchased by a collector who bought an old film reel tin on eBay for £3.20 (about $5) in September 2009 and found the nitrate film inside. He put it up for auction in June 2011 but the sole bid did not reach the £100,000 ($160,000) reserve price. The second copy was found in a tin of assorted items bought from a secondhand shop in Sheffield in July 2011.

Although a 1917 advertisement in the Manchester Film Renter announced a trade viewing, it may only have been shown in Egypt. An October 1917 entry in the British Board of Film Censorship's Ledgers says it was "For Export Only", and a Ministry of Interior film censorship certificate displayed at the beginning of the film states it was "Passed for Exhibition in Egypt".

References

1910s animated short films
1916 comedy films
American aviation films
Films set in London
World War I propaganda films
1910s rediscovered films
American silent short films
American black-and-white films
1916 short films
1916 animated films
1916 films
Rediscovered American films
Silent American comedy films
1910s American films
Silent war films
American propaganda films